Ko Lanta is a district (amphoe) in Krabi province, Thailand.

History
The district was established in December 1901. It consists of four island groups: Mu Ko Lanta (170 km2), Mu Ko Klang (162 km2), Mu Ko Rok (3.5 km2), and Mu Ko Ngai (3.6 km2). Other island groups are smaller, like Mu Ko Haa.

The origin of the name is unclear, but it may originate from the Javanese word lantas, meaning a type of grill for fish.  The name of the island was officially changed to Lanta in 1917.

It is believed that the area was one of the oldest communities in Thailand, dating back to the prehistoric period. It is believed that this province may have taken its name after the meaning of Krabi, which means 'sword'. This may have stemmed from a legend that an ancient sword was unearthed prior to the city's founding.

Geography

The district, approximately 70 km from Krabi town, consists of three major islands. The first, Ko Klang, is separated from the mainland by a small river (klong) and road bridge, and is often mistakenly thought of as part of mainland Krabi province. Of the two remaining larger islands, the larger, more populated Ko Lanta Yai (commonly known as simply "Ko Lanta") and the smaller Ko Lanta Noi, together with 50 other smaller islands make up the 52 island Mu Ko Lanta National Park. The largest island (Ko Lanta Yai) has nine beaches running down the entire west coast, forests, and tropical jungle. The geography of the island is typically mangroves, coral rimmed beaches, and tree-covered hills. A popular tourist destination, the islands are known for their long, sandy beaches and scuba diving. Ko Lanta Yai and Ko Lanta Noi are connected by the Siri Lanta Bridge opened in 2016. 

Neighboring districts are Nuea Khlong to the northwest and Khlong Thom to the northeast and east.

Mu Ko Lanta National Park, established in 1990 as the 62nd national park of Thailand, occupies 134 km2 of the district.

Climate

Administration
The district is divided into five subdistricts (tambons), which are further subdivided into 37 villages (mubans). Ko Lanta Yai has township (thesaban tambon) status and includes part of tambon Ko Lanta Yai.

Islands

Transport 
The nearest airports are at Krabi, Trang, and Phuket. Krabi Airport, the most popular one for travel to Ko Lanta, is approximately 10 km from the provincial town and operates international flights to several foreign destinations.

The nearest train station is in Trang Province just south of Krabi. From there, there are trains to and from Bangkok.

There are regular, daily ferry boats operating between Ko Lanta and Krabi, Phuket, and Ko Phi Phi. A ferry run by Phetpaily departs daily from Klongdao Pier on Ko Lanta to Ko Ngai and Ko Mook.

There are only two main roads on Ko Lanta, one in the northeast and another in the southwest, which runs parallel to the beach. On Ko Lanta Noi there is just one main road in the east and a smaller one that links to the ferry pier. On the mainland, Highway 4206 connects with Khlong Thom District, passing Khlong Yang and Koh Klang sub-districts to a public car ferry at Baan Hua Hin. To get from the mainland of Thailand to Ko Lanta Yai, two public car ferries must be taken. A bridge connecting Ko Lanta to the mainland is currently under construction.

Culture 
Krabi and Ko Lanta incorporate a mix of Buddhists, Thai-Chinese, Muslims, and sea gypsies. The majority of the population in rural areas is Muslim. The area, however, has no apparent religious tension. Most of them speak with a thick Southern dialect that is difficult for even other Thais to understand. Given this multiculturalism, Krabi is always celebrating something, be it Thai Buddhist, Thai-Chinese, or Thai-Islamic tradition. Chao-le (sea gypsies) inhabit Ko Lanta and follow a lifestyle that has been relatively unaffected by the islands' tourism.

The French TV show Koh-Lanta took place on Ko Lanta and took its name from there.

Gallery

Notes

References

External links
 

Ko Lanta